"Rain" is a song written and performed by American rock band Creed. It is the second single from their fourth album, Full Circle (2009).

The song premiered on MSN Music on September 22, 2009, and was released as a digital download on October 6, 2009. It debuted and peaked at number 91 on the Billboard Hot 100, and reached number 34 on the Mainstream Top 40 airplay chart, becoming their first entry on the latter chart since "One Last Breath" in 2002. In Australia, "Rain" reached number 52 on the ARIA Singles Chart, spending 13 weeks in the top 100.

The music video premiered on VH1 on October 27, 2009.

Charts

References

2009 singles
Creed (band) songs
Songs written by Mark Tremonti
Songs written by Scott Stapp
2009 songs
Wind-up Records singles